The United States has been participating at the  Deaflympics from 1935 and it is also currently placed first in the         all time Deaflympics medal list.
US has won more than 1000 medals, the only nation to do so in Deaflympics.

USA has been participating at the  Winter Deaflympics from 1967.

Medal tallies

Summer Universiade

     Host nation

Winter Deaflympics

Notable achievements 
 In the 1977 Summer Deaflympics held in Romania, Jeff Float of US won 10 gold medals in Swimming, which is still considered as a unique and unprecedented record in Deaflympics history
 Reed Gershwind holds the record for winning the most number of medals for United States in the Deaflympics history with 30 medals. This medal tally is also the second highest for any deaflympian just behind Terence Parkin of South Africa.

See also
United States at the Paralympics
United States at the Olympics

References

External links 
 2017 Deaflympics

 
Nations at the Deaflympics
Parasports in the United States
Deaf culture in the United States